East Bradford Boarding School for Boys, also known as the Richard Strode House, is a historic boys boarding school building located in East Bradford Township, Chester County, Pennsylvania. The original section of the house was built between 1790 and 1810.  It is a 2 1/2-story, five bay, stone structure with a gable roof with dormers.  The porches and kitchen wing were added in the 20th century.  A school operated in the dwelling from 1816 to 1857.

It was added to the National Register of Historic Places in 1973.  It is located in the Strode's Mill Historic District.

References

School buildings on the National Register of Historic Places in Pennsylvania
School buildings completed in 1800
Schools in Chester County, Pennsylvania
Historic district contributing properties in Pennsylvania
National Register of Historic Places in Chester County, Pennsylvania
1800 establishments in Pennsylvania